Never Met Picasso is a 1996 American comedy-drama film directed by Stephen Kijak and starring Alexis Arquette and Margot Kidder. Its plot follows a thirty-year-old gay man who attempts to get his life in order while living with his actress mother in Boston.

Cast
Alexis Arquette as Andrew Magnus
Margot Kidder as Genna Magnus
Georgia Ragsdale as Lucy
Don McKellar as Jerry
Keith David as Larry
Alvin Epstein as Uncle Alfred

Reception
Kevin Thomas of the Los Angeles Times wrote that "Arquette and Kidder given the chance to come across as quite appealing" in their roles.

References

1996 films
American LGBT-related films
American comedy-drama films
Films about fictional painters
Films set in Boston
Films shot in Boston
1996 comedy films
1996 drama films
1990s English-language films
1990s American films